
Year 1509 (MDIX) was a common year starting on Monday (link will display the full calendar) of the Julian calendar.

Events 
 January–June 
 January 21 – The Portuguese first arrive at the Seven Islands of Bombay and land at Mahim after capturing a  barge of the Gujarat Sultanate in the Mahim Creek.
 February 3 – Battle of Diu: The Portuguese defeat a coalition of Indians, Muslims and Italians.
 March 18 – Maximilian I, Holy Roman Emperor, names Margaretha land guardians of the Habsburg Netherlands.
 April 7 – The Kingdom of France declares war on the Republic of Venice.
 April 15 – The French army under the command of Louis XII leaves Milan to invade Venetian territory. Part of the War of the League of Cambrai and the Italian Wars.
 April 21 – Henry VIII becomes King of England (for 38 years) on the death of his father, Henry VII.
 April 27 – Pope Julius II places Venice under interdict and excommunication for refusing to cede part of Romagna to papal control.
 May 2 – Juan Ponce de León obtains authorization to bring his family from Spain to his home in the Casa de Contratación in Caparra, Puerto Rico.
 May 9
 The French army under the command of Louis XII crosses the Adda River at Cassano d'Adda.
 The Venetians, encamped around the town of Treviglio, move south towards the Po River in search of better positions.
 May 14 – Battle of Agnadello: French forces defeat the Venetians. The League of Cambrai occupies Venice's mainland territories.
 June 11
 Henry VIII of England marries Catherine of Aragon.
 Luca Pacioli's De divina proportione, concerning the golden ratio, is published in Venice, with illustrations by Leonardo da Vinci.
 June 19 – Brasenose College, Oxford, is founded by a lawyer, Sir Richard Sutton, of Prestbury, Cheshire, and the Bishop of Lincoln, William Smyth.
 June 24 – King Henry VIII of England and Queen Consort Catherine of Aragon are crowned.

 July–December 
 July 17 – Venetian forces retake the city of Padua from French forces.
 July 26 – Krishnadevaraya ascends the throne of the Vijayanagara Empire.
 August 8 – Maximillian I of the Holy Roman Empire along with French allies begins a siege of Padua that would last for months to retake the city.
 August 19 – Maximillian I orders all Jews within the Holy Roman Empire to destroy all books opposing Christianity.
 September 10 – The Constantinople earthquake destroys 109 mosques and kills an estimated 10,000 people.
 September 11 – Portuguese fidalgo Diogo Lopes de Sequeira becomes the first European to reach Malacca, having crossed the Gulf of Bengal.
 September 27 – A violent storm ravages the Dutch coast, killing potentially thousands of people.
 October 2 – The siege of Padua ends with Venetian victory, causing the retreat of HRE and French forces back to Tyrol and Milan.
 Aft. October 2 – Venetians forces reoccupy the city of Vicenza.
 November 4 – Afonso de Albuquerque becomes the governor of the Portuguese settlements in India.
 November 10 – Uriel von Gemmingen is assigned to secure others opinions before continuing the Jewish book purge started on August 19th.
 December – Francisco de Almeida begins his journey home to the Kingdom of Portugal from Diu, India.

 Date unknown 
 Erasmus writes his most famous work, In Praise of Folly.
 St Paul's School, London is founded by John Colet, Dean of St Paul's Cathedral.
 Royal Grammar School, Guildford, England, is founded under the will of Robert Beckingham.
 Queen Elizabeth's Grammar School, Blackburn, England, is founded as a grammar school for boys.
 Georg Tannstetter is appointed by Maximilian I as the Professor of Astronomy at the University of Vienna.
 Johannes Pfefferkorn writes his fourth and fifth pamphlets condemning the Jewish faith and people, Das Osterbuch and Der Judenfeind.
 Basil Solomon becomes Syriac Orthodox Maphrian of the East.

Births 

 January 2 – Henry of Stolberg, German nobleman (d. 1572)
 January 3 – Gian Girolamo Albani, Italian Catholic cardinal (d. 1591)
 January 25 – Giovanni Morone, Italian Catholic cardinal (d. 1580)
 February 2 – John of Leiden, Dutch Anabaptist leader (d. 1536)
 February 10 – Vidus Vidius, Italian surgeon and anatomist (d. 1569)
 March 25 – Girolamo Dandini, Italian Cardinal
 March 27 – Wolrad II, Count of Waldeck-Eisenberg, German nobleman (d. 1578)
 April 23 – Afonso of Portugal, Portuguese Roman Catholic cardinal (d. 1540)
 July 4 – Magnus III of Mecklenburg-Schwerin, German Lutheran bishop of the Prince-Bishopric of Schwerin (d. 1550)
 July 10 – John Calvin, French religious reformer (d. 1564)
 July 25 – Philip II, Count of Nassau-Saarbrücken, German nobleman (d. 1554)
 August 3 – Étienne Dolet, French scholar and printer (d. 1546)
 August 7 – Joachim I, Prince of Anhalt-Dessau, German prince (d. 1561)
 August 25 – Ippolito II d'Este, Italian cardinal and statesman (d. 1572)
 October 20 – Arthur Stewart, Duke of Rothesay, Scottish prince (d. 1510)
 November 4 – John, Duke of Münsterberg-Oels, Polish-German nobleman (d. 1565)

Date unknown 
 Anneke Esaiasdochter, Dutch Anabaptist  (d. 1539)
 Bernardino Telesio, Italian philosopher and natural scientist (d. 1588)
 Élie Vinet, French humanist (d. 1587)
 François de Scépeaux, French governor (d. 1571)
 François Douaren, French jurist (d. 1559)
 Gonzalo Jiménez de Quesada, Spanish conquistador (d. 1579)
 Guillaume Le Testu, French privateer (d. 1573)
 John Erskine of Dun, Scottish religious reformer (d. 1591)
 Naoe Kagetsuna, Japanese Clan Officer (d. 1577)
 Stanisław Odrowąż, Polish nobleman (d. 1545)

Deaths 

 January – Adam Kraft, German sculptor and architect (b. circa 1460)
 January 27 – John I, Count Palatine of Simmern, German nobleman (b. 1459)
 March 14 – Giovanni Antonio Sangiorgio, Italian cardinal (b. unknown)
 April 21 – Henry VII of England, King of England and Lord of Ireland (b. 1457)
 April 27 – Margaret of Brandenburg, German abbess of the Poor Clares monastery at Hof (b. 1453)
 May 28 – Caterina Sforza, Italian countess of Forlì (b. 1463)
 June 29 – Margaret Beaufort, Countess of Richmond and Derby, mother of Henry VII of England (b. 1443)
 July 11 – William II, Landgrave of Hesse, German nobleman (b. 1469)
 July 16:
 Joao da Nova, Portuguese explorer (b. 1460)
 Mikalojus Radvila the Old, Lithuanian nobleman (b. circa 1450)
 July 28 – Ignatius Noah of Lebanon, Syriac Orthodox patriarch of Antioch (b. 1451).
 December 1 – Lê Uy Mục, 8th king of the later Lê Dynasty of Vietnam (b. 1488)

Date unknown 
 Dmitry Ivanovich, Russian Grand Prince (b. 1483)
 Eleanor de Poitiers, Burgundian courter and writer (b. circa 1444)
 Hans Seyffer, German sculptor and woodcarver (b. circa 1460)
 Shen Zhou, Chinese painter (b. 1427)
 Viranarasimha Raya, Indian ruler of the Vijayanagar Empire (b. unknown)

References

Sources